Stenaelurillus sudanicus is  a species of jumping spider in the genus Stenaelurillus that lives in Sudan. It was first described in 2014 by Wanda Wesołowska. Only the female has been identified. The abdomen has markings similar to a spider of the genus Phlegra. It is distinguished from other members of the genus Stenaelurillus by the way that the copulatory openings face backwards.

Taxonomy and etymology
Stenaelurillus sudanicus was first described by Wanda Wesołowska in 2014. It is one of over 500 species identified by the Polish arachnologist. The genus Stenaelurillus was first raised by Eugène Simon in 1885. The name relates to the genus name Aelurillus, which itself derives from the Greek word for cat, with the addition of a Greek stem meaning narrow. In 2017, it was grouped with nine other genera of jumping spiders under the name Aelurillines. It has been placed in the subtribe Aelurillina in the tribe Aelurillini in the clade Saltafresia. The species name derives from the country where it was first found, Sudan.

Description
Only the female has been described. It has a brown carapace with a pair of white streaks, one along the edge of the body and the other stretching from the front to back. The eye field is black, while the legs are brown. The abdomen has markings that are more typical for spiders from the Phlegra genus, with three white stripes on a black background. The spider has yellowish grey pedipalps and a round palpal bulb. The epigyne has a deep pocket  with copulatory openings placed to the side. It differs from the similar Stenaelurillus siyamae, also found in the same area, by the way that the copulatory openings face backwards.

Distribution and habitat
The distribution is restricted to Sudan. The holotype for the species was found near Kerma in 1989. It was discovered in a house, which implies a level of comfort the spider has living in areas of human habitation.

References

Citations

Bibliography

Endemic fauna of Sudan
Fauna of Sudan
Spiders described in 2014
Spiders of Africa
Salticidae
Taxa named by Wanda Wesołowska